Jonathan Patrick O'Brien (born August 29, 1977) is an American former soccer player. After retiring, he pursued a career in psychology.

O'Brien was one of the first Americans to earn a starting spot with a major European team, with Ajax Amsterdam in the late 1990s. At the peak of his career, United States national teammate Landon Donovan called O'Brien the "best soccer player in the USA."

Professional career
O'Brien grew up in Playa del Rey, California and attended Brentwood School. After being brought to attention of youth director Co Adriaanse, he had his first trial with Ajax at the age of 14 and signed an amateur contract with the Dutch giants in 1994 as a 17-year-old. After two years on their youth teams, Ajax offered O'Brien a professional contract in 1998. He spent the 1998–99 season on loan to FC Utrecht and made his Ajax debut in 1999. He became a regular for the team, usually playing at left back, winning the Eredivisie in 2002 and 2004.

Unfortunately, chronic injuries limited O'Brien's playing time. He left Ajax for ADO Den Haag in February 2005. After one injury-riddled season, in which he only played three games for the club, O'Brien came to MLS for the first time, to sign with hometown club Chivas USA. O'Brien played only one game with Chivas before suffering an injury with the U.S. national team during the 2006 World Cup, and was released by the club following the 2006 season.

O'Brien stated that he was done playing in an interview on June 11, 2008.

International career
With the United States, O'Brien earned his first cap against Austria on April 22, 1998 but was an alternate for the U.S. squad for the 1998 FIFA World Cup. He played in the 2000 Summer Olympics, helping to lead the U.S. to a fourth-place finish. O'Brien became a regular with the senior team under Bruce Arena, and came into his own at the 2002 FIFA World Cup. Playing in defensive midfield, he scored the opener in the 3–2 win over Portugal, assisted on Clint Mathis' goal against South Korea, and played every minute of every game for the United States.

Four years later, O'Brien was named to the U.S. roster for the 2006 FIFA World Cup in Germany. On June 12, 2006, he played the second half of the U.S.'s opening game against the Czech Republic, albeit with a nagging injury, which kept him out for the duration of the tournament.

Personal life
O’ Brien lives with his wife and son near Boulder, Colorado. After retiring from football O’Brien returned to college and completed a doctorate in clinical psychology from Alliant International University. Dr. O’Brien has two separate practices, one providing mental health counseling to the general public and one working as a sports psychologist.

Career statistics

Club

International

Scores and results list the United States' goal tally first, score column indicates score after each O'Brien goal.

Honors
Ajax
Dutch Eredivisie: 2001–02, 2003–04
KNVB Cup: 2002
Johan Cruijff Shield: 2002

United States
CONCACAF Gold Cup: 2005

Individual
 CONCACAF Gold Cup Best XI (Honorable Mention): 2005

Notes

References

External links

 "What Ever Happened To: John O'Brien". MLSsoccer. February 22, 2011.

1977 births
Living people
American soccer players
Association football defenders
Association football midfielders
AFC Ajax players
FC Utrecht players
ADO Den Haag players
Chivas USA players
Eredivisie players
Major League Soccer players
United States men's international soccer players
Olympic soccer players of the United States
CONCACAF Gold Cup-winning players
Footballers at the 2000 Summer Olympics
2002 FIFA World Cup players
2005 CONCACAF Gold Cup players
2006 FIFA World Cup players
American expatriate soccer players
Expatriate footballers in the Netherlands
American expatriate sportspeople in the Netherlands
Soccer players from Los Angeles
United States men's youth international soccer players
United States men's under-20 international soccer players
United States men's under-23 international soccer players